The 1989 Florida State Seminoles football team represented Florida State University in the 1989 NCAA Division I-A football season. The team was coached by Bobby Bowden and played their home games at Doak Campbell Stadium.

Schedule

Personnel

Rankings

Season summary

Southern Miss

Clemson

at LSU

Tulane

at Syracuse

at Virginia Tech

Auburn

Miami (FL)

Prior to the Miami-FSU game, University of Miami mascot Sebastian the Ibis was tackled by a group of police officers for attempting to put out Chief Osceola's flaming spear. Sebastian was wearing a fireman’s helmet and yellow raincoat and holding a fire extinguisher. When a police officer attempted to grab the fire extinguisher, the officer was sprayed in the chest. Sebastian was handcuffed by four officers but ultimately released. Miami quarterback Gino Torretta, who started the game in place of injured Craig Erickson, told ESPN, "Even if we weren't bad boys, it added to the mystique that, 'Man, look, even their mascot's getting arrested.'"

South Carolina

Memphis State

at Florida

Peter Tom Willis 20/32, 319 Yds
Terry Anthony 4 Rec, 126 Yds

Nebraska (Fiesta Bowl)

References

Florida State
Florida State Seminoles football seasons
Fiesta Bowl champion seasons
Florida State Seminoles football